Eirini Karra is a Greek model who took part in the Miss Star Hellas pageant in April 2006, and represented her country in the Miss World 2006 pageant, held in Warsaw, Poland. She is currently represented by Ace Models and is also well known for her large participation in the IrchaLovesToby campaign.

In April 2006 Eirini won the title Miss Hellas (Μις Ελλάς). She represented Greece at the Miss World 2006 pageant on September 30, 2006, in Warsaw, Poland.

References

External links
 Ace Models
 
 

Greek female models
Living people
1986 births
Miss World 2006 delegates
Greek beauty pageant winners
People from Karditsa